The fourth season of Private Practice premiered on September 23, 2010, and concluded on May 19, 2011.  The season consisted of 22 episodes.

Plot
Addison and Sam continue their relationship, and eventually hit a rough patch when Addison decides that she wants a baby, and Sam doesn't want one because he already has Maya and Olivia. Addison's life gets complicated when she is forced to sit by her mother's wife's side and watch her die, because of the DNR, and is faced with the repercussions when her mother commits suicide. After going to therapy, Addison decides that she needs to take her life in a new direction, and not do everything that she always does, and meets a man at the super-market. She begins seeing the man, but doesn't know who he is and eventually agrees to go to Fiji with him, until she goes back to Sam and rekindles their relationship but says that she still wants a baby. Naomi inherits millions from her boyfriend William White following his death. On top of having to deal with his death, Naomi also has to deal with the fact that her best friend and ex-husband are in a real relationship now. She is easing well into her new role as a grandmother, even though she was less than thrilled to find out her 16-year-old daughter Maya was pregnant. Naomi eventually admits that she isn't happy with where her life is at the moment and makes a decision to find her purpose elsewhere. Sam and Addison are still dating but are at different points in their lives. Addison wants a child, but Sam has a child and a grandchild so he would rather just enjoy their time together and put off having kids indefinitely. Sam's biggest challenge is that he is in a relationship with Addison but she is pulling away, so he ends up kissing Naomi which leads him to believe that maybe there is still a chance for a romantic relationship between them. Naomi's head is elsewhere so neither women (Addison or Naomi) is actually on the same page as him.

Cooper and Charlotte are forced to deal with the aftermaths of Charlotte's rape, but Cooper doesn't know about the rape until long after it has happened. After being raped Charlotte decides not to tell Cooper, or the police, but soon after hearing Violet's rape story she finds that she needs to come clean and decides to tell Cooper about everything. Cooper and Charlotte are faced with not being able to prosecute the rapist when her lawyer states everything was thrown out when she lied. Cooper and Charlotte try to get their lives back together, including their sex lives, but are forced to put it on hold when Charlotte can't even be touched because of the assault. Charlotte is again faced with her attacker, when he comes into the hospital after getting stabbed, but eventually puts everything to peace when she forgives him; At Bizzy and Susan's wedding they find that they are finally able to have sex again. While things at their own wedding get interesting when their parents decided they shouldn't get married only for Cooper and Charlotte to get married in Vegas. Following Pete's proposal these two finally get married and start to raise their child together. Violet gets a book deal, the details of which offend her friends and colleagues. Pete's past catches up with her when his brother comes to him telling him that their mother (who is in prison) needs his help. Violet pushes Pete to help his mother and through Pete's interaction with his mother details of his childhood are revealed. Sheldon continues to be the resident "therapist" to all his friends and colleagues. Everyone comes to him for advice so he is like their guardian angel who calmly pushes them all in the right direction. He starts an affair with a writer who gave Violet's new book a bad review despite the warning from Cooper that the affair is going to jeopardise his friendship with Violet. It is revealed that Amelia is a recovering substance abuser and that the reason she started in the first place was due to her father getting shot, which left her feeling empty and so she turned to drugs. She finally mends her relationship with her brother Derek Shepherd following his survival of a gunshot wound. She is currently helping her friend deal with a fatal disease.

Cast and characters

Main cast
 Kate Walsh as Addison Montgomery
 Tim Daly as Pete Wilder
 Audra McDonald as Naomi Bennett
 Paul Adelstein as Cooper Freedman
 KaDee Strickland as Charlotte King
 Brian Benben as Sheldon Wallace
 Caterina Scorsone as Amelia Shepherd
 Taye Diggs as Sam Bennett
 Amy Brenneman as Violet Turner

Recurring cast
 Nicholas Brendon as Lee McHenry
 Cristián de la Fuente as Dr. Eric Rodriguez
 JoBeth Williams as Bizzy Montgomery
 Michael Patrick Thornton as Gabriel Fife
 Hailey Sole as Betsey Parker
 Amanda Foreman as Katie Kent
 Ann Cusack as Susan Grant
 Alex Kingston as Marla Tompkins
 Grant Show as Archer Montgomery
 Stephen Collins as "The Captain" Montgomery
 Stephen Lunsford as Filmore "Dink" Davis
 Louise Fletcher as Frances Wilder
 Kyle Secor as Adam Wilder
 Blue Deckert as Joe Price
 Myk Watford as Billy Douglas
 Michael Bofshever as Neal Chaplin
 Sydney Tamiia Poitier as Michelle

Special guest stars
 Benjamin Bratt as Jake Reilly

Guest stars
 French Stewart as Kevin Mason
 Currie Graham as Ryan Mason
 Tess Harper as Augusta King
 Michael Badalucco as Nick

Episodes

Ratings

DVD release

References

2010 American television seasons
2011 American television seasons
Private Practice (TV series) seasons